The 2023 USC Trojans men's volleyball team represents the University of Southern California in the 2023 NCAA Division I & II men's volleyball season. The Trojans, led by eighth year head coach Jeff Nygaard, play their home games at Galen Center. The Trojans are members of the MPSF and were picked to finish fourth in the MPSF preseason poll.

Season highlights
Will be filled in as the season progresses.

Roster

Schedule
TV/Internet Streaming information:
All home games will be televised on Pac-12 Network or streamed on Pac-12+ USC. Most road games will also be streamed by the schools streaming service. The conference tournament will be streamed by FloVolleyball. 

 *-Indicates conference match. (#)-Indicates tournament seeding.
 Times listed are Pacific Time Zone.

Announcers for televised games

UC Santa Barbara: Max Kelton & Katie Spieler
UC Irvine: Rob Espero & Charlie Brande
UC Santa Barbara: Max Kelton & Cameron Greene  
CSUN: 
Penn State: 
Grand Canyon: 
Grand Canyon: 
Stanford: 
Stanford: 
Menlo: 
Pepperdine: 
Pepperdine: 
Long Beach State: 
Long Beach State: 
BYU: 
BYU: 
UCLA: 
UCLA: 
Concordia Irvine: 
Concordia Irvine: 
MPSF Quarterfinal:

Rankings 

^The Media did not release a Pre-season or Week 1 poll.

References

2023 in sports in California
2023 NCAA Division I & II men's volleyball season
USC